Marcus Vaapil (born 24 August 1977) is a Swedish former footballer who played as a right-back. He is now manager for the division 4 club IK Vista from Kaxholmen.

References

Association football midfielders
Swedish footballers
Swedish football managers
Allsvenskan players
Superettan players
Malmö FF players
Sweden under-21 international footballers
Sweden youth international footballers
Living people
1977 births